Malachai (Shadow Weaver Part 2) is an experimental album by The Legendary Pink Dots released in 1993 on Play It Again Sam Records.

Track listing

Personnel
The Prophet Qa'Sepel (a.k.a. Edward Ka-Spel) - vox inhumana, keyboards
Ryan Moore - bass guitar, acoustic guitar
Niels van Hoornblower - saxophones, clarinet, bass clarinet, flute
The Silverman - keyboards, exotic devices
Patrick Q-Wright - violin, viola
Steven Stapleton - more exotic devices

Additional personnel
Produced by Steven Stapleton and The Legendary Pink Dots.

Engineered by Vincent Hoedt, X-Ray Alley and The Legendary Pink Dots.

References

 

1993 albums
The Legendary Pink Dots albums
Caroline Records albums